Army Institute of Business Administration may refer to:

Army Institute of Business Administration, Savar, Bangladesh
Army Institute of Business Administration, Sylhet, Bangladesh